Fennis Marx Dembo (born January 24, 1966) is a retired American professional basketball player for the 1989 National Basketball Association champion Detroit Pistons. A small forward, he only played in the NBA for one season, averaging 1.2 points and 0.7 rebounds in 31 games. He was selected by the Pistons in the second round (30th overall) of the 1988 NBA draft.

College career
Dembo was barely recruited out of high school in San Antonio, Texas, but caught a break when he was sought out by Wyoming's then head coach Jim Brandenburg, who had previously been a high school coach in that city (and would later retire to San Antonio). Dembo's campus visit was the first time he had seen snow; he went on a snowmobile trip as part of the visit, and would remember in a 2009 interview that he had a gut feeling that Wyoming was for him.

At Wyoming, Dembo had a successful career, finishing as the leading scorer and rebounder in Cowboys history. He accumulated 2,311 points and 954 rebounds. He was part of the Cowboys team that qualified for the finals at the 1986 National Invitation Tournament. The following year, the Cowboys qualified for the Sweet Sixteen of the 1987 NCAA Division I men's basketball tournament. At the 1987 NCAA Tournament, Dembo was the leading scorer, averaging 27.8 points per game. Dembo appeared on the cover of Sports Illustrated dressed as a cowboy. He was the first basketball player from the University of Wyoming to be featured on the SI cover. He was inducted into the University of Wyoming Athletics Hall of Fame on October 29, 1993. His number was retired and hosted up in Wyoming's Arena Auditorium during half time on December 7, 2019.

After the NBA
He played for several years in Europe and the CBA after his release from the Pistons, retiring in 1998. He then bounced between several jobs, including a stint as a prison guard in Alabama. After separating from his second wife, he moved in with his mother in San Antonio, and found employment as a maintenance person for the San Antonio Water District.

Early on Easter morning in 2003, a man broke into Dembo's house while he and his mother were sleeping. Dembo grabbed a gun and faced the intruder, warning him to stop and leave. When the intruder failed to stop, Dembo shot and killed him. No charges were filed against Dembo, but he was shaken by the incident, fearful for a time to talk to others or to leave his room. He ultimately was able to move on from the shooting with counseling and time. His job with the Water District sparked an interest in engineering, and he began taking courses in the subject when his schedule allowed. In the autumn of 2009, he enrolled full-time at St. Philip's College, a community college in San Antonio. In the fall of 2009, he was enrolled at the University of Texas at San Antonio.

Name
Dembo's unusual first name came from a suggestion by an older sister, Zona. He and his twin sister Fenise were the 11th and 12th children in their family. Zona preferred that they be the last children in the family, and suggested they be named after finis, French for "finish".

Awards and honors
 First Team All-Western Athletic Conference (1986, 1987, 1988)
 Western Athletic Conference Player of the Year (1987)
 NCAA basketball tournament record (Best Free Throw Percentage in One Game – 100%)
 Inducted into the University of Wyoming Athletics Hall of Fame in 1993

References

External links
Fennis Dembo Remains a Name to Remember

1966 births
Living people
African-American basketball players
All-American college men's basketball players
American expatriate basketball people in France
American expatriate basketball people in Italy
American men's basketball players
Basketball players at the 1987 Pan American Games
Basketball players from Alabama
Basketball players from San Antonio
Chorale Roanne Basket players
Detroit Pistons draft picks
Detroit Pistons players
Pan American Games medalists in basketball
Pan American Games silver medalists for the United States
Power forwards (basketball)
Rapid City Thrillers players
Shreveport Crawdads players
Small forwards
Sportspeople from Mobile, Alabama
Wyoming Cowboys basketball players
Medalists at the 1987 Pan American Games
21st-century African-American people
20th-century African-American sportspeople